The 2021–22 Third Division Football League will be 7th season of the Dhaka Third Division Football League. The league scheduled to kicked off on February to TBC 2022. A total of 15 football clubs will participate  in the league.

Alamgir Somaj Kallyan KS is the current champion having won 2019–20
season title.

Participants clubs
The following fifteen teams are competes in the league.

Asaduzzaman Football Academy 
Chakhbazar Kings
Dipali Jubo Sangha
Elias Ahmad Chowdhury Smrity Sangha
FC Brahmanbaria
FC Uttar Bongo
Green Welfare Center Munshigonj
Lalbagh Sporting Club
Rainbow Athletic Club
Shantinagar Club
Skylark Football Club
The Muslims Institute
Tangail Football Academy 
Uttara Friends Club
Wazed Miah Krira Chakra

Venues
The venues of the league will be announced soon.

References

Dhaka Third Division Football League
2023 in Bangladeshi football
2021–22 in Asian association football leagues